Evi Greta Roberta Hanssen (born 9 November 1978) is a Flemish singer and presenter.

Biography
Hanssen grew up with three older brothers in the neighbourhood of Antwerp. She started as a background singer in the Samson en Gert Christmas shows and played on her 16th in Samson en Gert Sofie, the niece of the mayor. Hanssen was second on the election of 'Look of the year' in 1996. After secondary school she studied at the 'Jazzstudio' in Antwerp for two years and received her candidacy as a singer in jazz music at the conservatory.

Career
In April 2001 Hanssen started as a VJ on TMF Flanders, where she presented with Elke Vanelderen in Boobietrap. She also presented major festivals, such as Marktrock, Suikerrock, TW Classic and I Love Techno. She interviewed Lenny Kravitz and Justin Timberlake, among others. In the summer of 2002 she was asked to replace Yasmine at Aan tafel on TV1. She was also regularly seen in Het Swingpaleis.

Her debut single "Down as she goes" with the new group Hookers Green became the new favourite song of Greenpeace in Belgium. The song is about the decline of the world in every possible way.

In October 2003 she left TMF to concentrate on her music. She worked on a theatre jazz project and on a Dutch-language album with Patrick Hamilton. She was heard as a flying reporter at Radio Donna staat op and can be seen on the sports channel Sporza. For Garfield: The Movie she dubbed her voice to the American cat. She then worked for VTM, where she presented De Farm and 71° Noord.

From 2006 to 2013 she presented Expeditie Robinson annually. Since March 2007 she can also be seen in De Foute Quiz and GodzijDank. In 2008 and 2009, Evi presented the Flemish version of Project Runway, De Designers. In 2010 she was on show in De dagshow, a showbiz programme on VTM.

In 2013 she presented with Kürt Rogiers in De Grote Sprong, in 2014 Beat da Bompaz and Mijn Pop-uprestaurant. From 2014 she can be seen on Dutch television in "3 op Reis". In September 2014 she started as a table lady at De Wereld Draait Door. In 2016, together with Freek Vonk, she presents De Super Freek Show.

In 2019, she was a candidate in the Dutch television show Wie is de Mol? She was the first candidate to leave the game in episode 2.

Private life
Hanssen married in September 2005 to Fred di Bono, front man of the Belgian formation Silverene. They founded the production house Bonhanssa together. Later they had two children. The couple split up at the end of 2011.

Television

Discography

Singles

Trivia
UMA, the band of Evi Hanssen, released their first album, Polaroid, at the end of 2011.
Hanssen can be seen in the video Ik vind je lekker from The Haagse band De Kraaien.
In 2004 Hanssen participated in the second season of De Slimste Mens ter Wereld. During her first participation she lost the final and consequently she had to leave the quiz.
In 2017 Hanssen again participated in De Slimste Mens ter Wereld. This time she kept the one episode longer.

References

Dutch-language singers of Belgium
Belgian radio presenters
Belgian women radio presenters
Flemish television presenters
Belgian women television presenters
Flemish child actors
People from Zoersel
1978 births
Living people
21st-century Belgian singers